Early Times is a brand of Kentucky whiskey produced by the Sazerac Company, one of the two largest spirits companies in the United States, which purchased the brand in mid-2020. Before the brand purchase, it was distilled in Shively, Kentucky, by the Brown-Forman Corporation, another of the largest North American-owned companies in the spirits and wine business.

While Early Times is marketed outside the U.S. as bourbon, the whiskey does not meet all the U.S. regulated criteria for bourbon – and hence, is marketed within the U.S. as whiskey (rather than as bourbon whiskey).  In 2010, Brown-Forman introduced Early Times 354 in the U.S., which meets the regulated criteria for straight whiskey.

History

The Early Times Whisky brand production started at Early Times Station, Kentucky, and was introduced in 1860. The Kentucky water surrounding the "Station" was used for making the whiskey. The water naturally filtered through limestone springs. Early Times was not popular until 1920 when Congress passed the Volstead Act and Prohibition began. The brand prospered due to its maker having a license to continue production for medicinal purposes.

The Brown–Forman Company acquired the Early Times brand in 1923, and over the next 30 years made Early Times the best-selling whisky in the country. It later became sold in over 40 countries. It ranks as one of the top four selling Kentucky whiskeys in the world, and in 2005 it became the top selling Kentucky whisky in Japan.

In mid-2020, the brand was sold to the Sazerac Company.

Production and products
Before the sale to Sazerac, the brand was owned by Brown-Forman and was produced at the Brown-Forman Distillery in Shively, Kentucky. Most of the Early Times which is now sold in the U.S. cannot legally be labeled as a bourbon whiskey within the U.S., so it is labeled as "Kentucky Whisky". Some of the spirits in Early Times are aged in used barrels, while bourbon must be aged in new barrels according to the legal requirements for bourbon sold within the U.S. It is bottled at 40% alcohol by volume.

Marketing activity
In 1987, Brown–Forman contracted with Churchill Downs to market Early Times mint juleps as the "official drink" of the Kentucky Derby. Until 2015, Early Times Mint Juleps were sold during Derby Week each year. The highest-priced mint juleps at the event use bourbon from the Brown-Forman sister brand, Woodford Reserve, which is marketed as the "official bourbon" of the Kentucky Derby. Old Forester, a bourbon also made by Brown-Forman, replaced Early Times starting May 2nd, 2015  as the standard Kentucky Derby whisky for the lower-priced mint juleps.

See also 
 Jack Daniel's
 Jim Beam
 Evan Williams
 Maker's Mark

References

External links
Early Times website

Brown–Forman brands
Bourbon whiskey
Economy of Louisville, Kentucky
American brands
1860 introductions
1860 establishments in Kentucky